Pip Adam is a novelist, short story writer, and reviewer from New Zealand.

Background 
Adam was born in Christchurch, New Zealand. She attended the New Zealand Film and Television School in Christchurch before moving to Dunedin. Adam has an MA in Library and Information Studies and an MA in creative writing from Victoria University of Wellington. In 2012 she completed her PhD, also from Victoria University, supervised by Damien Wilkins.

Adam lives with her partner, Brent McIntyre, and their son, Bo Adam, in Wellington.

Works 

 Everything We Hoped For (2010) – short story collection
 I'm Working On A Building (2013) – novel 
 The New Animals (2017) – novel 
 Nothing To See (2020) – novel

Adam has been published in a number of literary journals including Overland (2015), takahē (2014), Fire Dials (2014), Sport (2008–2014), Landfall (2009, 2010), and Hue & Cry (2007–2013).

Adam is a book reviewer on Jesse Mulligan's show broadcast on Radio New Zealand. She also hosts the Better off Read podcast.

The photographer Ann Shelton used writing by Adam in her 2015 installation House Work: a project about a house.

Adam has taught creative writing at Victoria University of Wellington, Massey University and at Whitirea New Zealand. With the Write Where You Are collective, she has taught writing at the Arohata Women's Prison.

She was appointed Creative New Zealand Writer in Residence for 2021 at Te Herenga Waka - Victoria University of Wellington’s International Institute of Modern Letters. In February 2023 it was reported that The New Animals would be published in the USA.

Awards 

Everything We Hoped For won the NZSA Hubert Church Best First Book Award for Fiction at the 2011 New Zealand Post Book Awards.

Adam also received the New Generation Award in the 2012 Macquarie Private Wealth New Zealand Arts Awards from the Arts Foundation of New Zealand and was a runner up in the 2007 Sunday Star Times Short Story Competition.

The New Animals won New Zealand's top fiction prize, the Acorn Foundation Fiction Prize for 2018 and Nothing to See was shortlisted for the same award in 2021.

References

External links 

 Better off Read podcast
 

Living people
Victoria University of Wellington alumni
New Zealand fiction writers
New Zealand women novelists
New Zealand women short story writers
Academic staff of the Massey University
People from Christchurch
People from Wellington City
Year of birth missing (living people)
International Institute of Modern Letters alumni